Paradise is the debut studio album by French house DJ Bob Sinclar. It was released via Yellow Productions in 1998. The same year, "Gym Tonic" was remade into "Gym and Tonic" by the British production duo Spacedust, and reached number one on the UK Singles Chart.

Track listing

Personnel
Credits adapted from liner notes.

 Bob Sinclar – writing, composition, production (except "Get into the Music")
 Q-T Fingers – writing, production (on "Get into the Music")
 Lee A. Genesis – writing, production (on "My Only Love")
 Tommy Musto – writing, production (on "My Only Love")
 Ernest St. Laurent – guitar (on "My Only Love")
 Thomas Bangalter – programming, mixing (on "Gym Tonic")
 Cutee B – mixing
 JC – mastering
 J-C Polien – cover
 Serge Jacques – booklet
 Alain Charlot – booklet
 La Shampouineuse – design
 Alain Ho – A&R
 Chris "Da French Kiss" – A&R

Charts

References

External links
 
 

1998 debut albums
Bob Sinclar albums
Yellow Productions albums